Fernando Andreu Merelles is a judge of the Audiencia Nacional in Spain. He plays a leading role especially in humanitarian law and in pursuing war-crime and similar issues (see linking articles relating to Rwanda, Israel, etc.). Such investigations are made possible by Spain's principle of universal jurisdiction in alleged cases of crimes against humanity, genocide, and terrorism.

2002 Gaza Strip bomb
On 29 January 2009 Andreu opened preliminary investigations into claims that a bomb attack on Gaza in 2002 warranted the prosecution of the former Israeli defence minister Binyamin Ben-Eliezer, the former defence chief-of-staff Moshe Ya'alon, the former air force chief Dan Halutz, and four others, for crimes against humanity. He has been investigating the deaths of 15 Palestinians terrorists, part of them civilians, who died when the Israeli air force bombed a house in Gaza City. 
The attack killed a leader of the military wing of the Islamist movement Hamas, Salah Shehade, along with 14 civilians, mainly children, and wounded some dozens of civilians, according to the complaint.

Rwandan genocide
Andreu has also investigated the Rwandan genocide and allegations of war crimes by Rwandan Patriotic Army (RPA) and Rwandan Patriotic Front figures in Rwanda and the Democratic Republic of the Congo between 1994 and 2000.

References

External links
"Spain judge indicts Rwanda forces" (BBC)
Yearbook of International Humanitarian Law

21st-century Spanish judges
Year of birth missing (living people)
Living people